"Do Not Go Gentle Into That Good Night" is the second television play episode of the first season of the American television series CBS Playhouse. The title of the episode is taken from the first line of a Dylan Thomas poem, which tells the story of a carpenter who has built his own home, but is now too old and infirm to live on his own, and is sent to live in an old age home against his desires.

It was broadcast in October 1967, and was eventually nominated for five Emmy awards, including a nomination for supporting actor Lawrence Dobkin, a win in the category of best actor for Melvyn Douglas in the lead role, and a win in the category of Outstanding Writing Achievement in Drama for Loring Mandel.

References

External links 
 

1967 American television episodes
1967 plays
CBS Playhouse episodes